The Lehigh Valley Crocs was a men's Australian Rules Football team that was part of the United States Australian Football League

The team, based in Bethlehem, Pennsylvania, United States, was founded in April 1999 by Michelle and Robert Giabardo. Giabardo was the team's head coach.

References

Australian rules football clubs in the United States
Bethlehem, Pennsylvania
Australian rules football clubs established in 1999
1999 establishments in Pennsylvania